Bent Larsen (born 31 August 1942) is a Danish rower. He competed in the men's coxed four event at the 1964 Summer Olympics.

References

1942 births
Living people
Danish male rowers
Olympic rowers of Denmark
Rowers at the 1964 Summer Olympics
Rowers from Copenhagen